Ernst Ferdinand Peschl  (1 September 1906 – 9 June 1986) was a German mathematician.

Early life 

Ernst Peschl came from a family of brewery owners. He was born to Eduard Ferdinand Peschl and his wife, Ulla (née Adler) in 1906.

Education and academic appointments 

After finishing secondary school in 1925 in Passau, Peschl started studying mathematics, physics, and astronomy in Munich.  He received his doctorate in 1931 from the University of Munich under the supervision of Constantin Carathéodory with a dissertation titled Über die Krümmung von Niveaukurven bei der konformen Abbildung einfachzusammenhängender Gebiete auf das Innere eines Kreises; eine Verallgemeinerung eines Satzes von E. Study ("On the curvature of level curves of the conformal mapping of simply connected domains to the interior of a circle: A generalization of a theorem of Eduard Study").  This was followed by some years spent working as an assistant with Robert König in Jena and Heinrich Behnke in Münster.  He habilitated in 1935 at the University of Jena. Peschl took up a visiting professorship at the University of Bonn in 1938, and was subsequently promoted to extraordinary professor there.

Under pressure Peschl became a member of the Nazi Party and the paramilitary Sturmabteilung, but he avoided any activity within either organization and ended SA service after a year. From 1941 to 1943, he served as a French interpreter for the Wehrmacht. From 1943 to 1945, he worked at the German Aviation Research Institute in Brunswick, which exempted him from further military service during World War II.

After the war Peschl became the director of the Institute of Mathematics in Bonn, and in 1948 he became a full professor there. He promoted applied mathematics and established the Institute for Instrumental Mathematics in Bonn which evolved into the Society for Mathematics and Data Processing. He led the Society with Heinz Unger from 1969 to 1974.

Work 

Ernst Peschl's main areas of research were geometric complex analysis, partial differential equations, and the theory of functions of several complex variables.

Peschl was the doctoral advisor of Claus Müller, Friedhelm Erwe, Karl Wilhelm Bauer, Bernhard Korte, Stephan Ruscheweyh, and Karl-Joachim Wirths, among others.

Peschl received an honorary doctorate from the University of Toulouse in 1969 and another honorary doctorate from the University of Graz in 1982. For his fruitful collaboration with French mathematicians, the French government awarded him an Officier des Palmes Académiques in 1975.

Peschl was a regular member of the North Rhine-Westphalian Academy of Sciences, the Bavarian and Austrian Academies of Sciences and a corresponding member of the Académie des Sciences, Inscriptions et Belles-Lettres in Toulouse.  He was awarded the Pierre Fermat Medal and the Medal of the University of Jyväskylä, Finland, in 1965.

Personal life 

Peschl married Maria Stein, a physician, in 1940, and had one daughter, Gisela.

Publications 
 Über die Krümmung von Niveaukurven bei der konformen Abbildung einfachzusammenhängender Gebiete auf das Innere eines Kreises. Eine Verallgemeinerung eines Satzes von E. Study ("On the curvature of level curves of the conformal mapping of simply connected domains to the interior of a circle: A generalization of a theorem of Eduard Study"), Mathematische Annalen 106, 1932, pp. 574–594
 Zur Theorie der schlichten Funktionen ("On the theory of schlicht functions"), Crelle's Journal 176, 1937, pp. 61–94
 Über den Cartan-Carathéodoryschen Eindeutigkeitssatz ("On the Cartan-Carathéodory uniqueness theorem"), Mathematische Annalen 119, 1943, pp. 131–139
 Analytische Geometrie ("Analytic geometry"), Bibliographisches Institut ("Bibliographical Institute"), Mannheim 1961
 Funktionentheorie ("Complex analysis"), Bibliographisches Institut, Mannheim 1967
 Differentialgeometrie ("Differential geometry"), Bibliographisches Institut, Mannheim 1973,

Footnotes

Further reading 

 
 Sanford L. Segal, Ernst Peschl. In  Mathematicians under the Nazis, Princeton University Press, 2003, p. 461
 Ernst Peschl's obituary. In Österreichische Mathematische Gesellschaft, and International Mathematical Union. International mathematical news. No. 144, February 1987

External links 

 

Mathematical analysts
20th-century German mathematicians
1906 births
1986 deaths
People from Passau
Ludwig Maximilian University of Munich alumni
Academic staff of the University of Jena
Officers Crosses of the Order of Merit of the Federal Republic of Germany